Ana Đurić (born 12 October 1978), known professionally as Konstrakta, is a Serbian singer and songwriter. She had risen to prominence as the lead vocalist of the indie pop band Zemlja gruva!, which was founded in 2007, before pursuing her solo career in 2019. 

Konstrakta gained more significant recognition by representing Serbia at the Eurovision Song Contest 2022 in Turin, Italy with "In corpore sano", where she placed 5th out of 40 competing entries.

Career

2007–2018: Zemlja gruva!
She debuted as a member of the lesser-known electronic group called Mistakemistake in the early 2000s, but gained initial recognition as the lead singer of the Belgrade-based band Zemlja gruva!. Together they released three studio albums: WTF Is Gruveland? (2010), Dino u Zemlji Gruva (2013), which covered songs by Croatian singer Dino Dvornik, and Šta stvarno želiš? (2016). Some of the band's best-known hits include "Najlepše želje" (2010), "Nisam znala da sam ovo htela" (2011), and "Jače manijače" (2013). Zemlja gruva! took part in Beovizija music festival in 2008 and 2009 with "Čudesni svetovi" and "Svejedno mi je", respectively.

2019–2022: Solo beginnings and Eurovision Song Contest
Konstrakta pursued her solo career with the release of the single "Žvake" in June 2019. In March 2020, she released "Neam šamana", inspired by a tabloid article about Emina Jahović seeking help from a shaman to overcome her divorce from Mustafa Sandal. 

On 28 February 2022, Konstrakta released her project Triptih (Triptych), a 12-minute music video for three songs – "Nobl" (Noble), "In corpore sano" (In a Healthy Body) and "Mekano" (Soft). The project's concept was created by Konstrakta herself, alongside Ana Rodić and Maja Uzelac, the latter of whom also directed the video. The video and the songs illustrate modern-day life in Serbia, each focusing on a particular aspect.

On 8 February 2022, the song "In corpore sano" was announced as one of the 36 entries for the national selection festival broadcast on Radio Television of Serbia to choose Serbia's representative for the Eurovision Song Contest 2022. Entering the competition as an underdog, Konstrakta quickly acquired popularity following her performance in the first semi-final on 3 March, where she placed second and thus qualified for the final. In the final, which was held on 5 March, "In corpore sano" won both the jury vote and the public vote, receiving 31.34% of the public votes and therefore winning the competition. Next to the overwhelming support from the Serbian public, Konstrakta also received open praise from numerous regional public figures, such as the likes of Porfirije, Serbian Patriarch, and Novak Djokovic. She also received praise from fellow musicians and composers such as Tonči Huljić for both her lyrics, music and visuals. During the second semi-final of Eurovision, held on 12 May, Konstrakta performed third and qualified to the grand final. It was later revealed that she was the second runner-up of the evening with 237 points. On 14 May, Konstrakta performed second to last in the finale, placing fifth overall with 312 points. On the evening of the final, she won the Artistic Marcel Bezençon Award. She also received an award from the Polish media for the most creative entry.

In late May 2022, Konstrakta performed for the first time after Eurovision at Sea Star Festival in Umag, Croatia to estimated crowd of close to 20,000 people. Subsequently, Konstrakta and Zemlja gruva! became the first local headliners on the main stage of Exit in July 2022.

2023–present: 
In January 2023, Konstrakta performed alongside KOIKOI band at the Eurosonic Noorderslag music showcase festival in Groningen. On 1 March, Konstrakta premiered "Evo, obećavam!" (Here, I Promise!) during the first semi-final of the Serbian national selection competition for the Eurovision Song Contest 2023. The single was written in an omnibus form, and is split into three parts: "Depresivna sam" (I'm Depressed), "Anksiozan sam" (I'm Anxious) and "Obećaj mi" (Promise Me), dealing with the issues of depression and anxiety. The music video was released the same night, and is separated into three parts corresponding to the song, each of which was directed by a separate director.

Personal life
Ignjatović is the daughter of the former minister of information in the government of the Federal Republic of Yugoslavia, Slobodan Ignjatović. Her father comes from the village of Glibovac.

She graduated from the Faculty of Architecture, University of Belgrade.

Ignjatović married architect, Milan Đurić in 2009, with whom she has a son named Nikola and a daughter named Lena.

Artistry
Serbian journalist and music critic Petar "Peca" Popović attributed the singer's success to her "originality and literacy", which he saw to be "in collision" with all the pop, folk and turbo-folk music widespread in Serbia and the ex-Yugoslav region. He saw Konstrakta as rising above the existing genres and "offering a different universe" in 2022. Her music was seen as a "representation of the world, the ground, the climate, art and culture to which she and many people belong to". Gorčin Stojanović, the art director of the Yugoslav Drama Theatre, commented "in the socio-political turmoil which is present for decades in the region, Ana Đurić is the embodiment of the metropolis". A member of the Eurovision panel described her as "musically interesting, weirdish, untypically Eurovision-like".

Đurić possesses the vocal range of a contralto.

Influence and legacy
The lyrics of "In corpore sano" became widely referenced by the public on social media and used in various parodies, sketches and reworks due to its "memeability and virability". She was also supported by people from many different political parties, including liberals and nationalists. Konstrakta herself revealed that she was "scared of the lack of negative criticism of what she does".

Furthermore, shortly after achieving the "pop stardom" status many soap and shampoo companies offered the singer deals to promote their products. Konstrakta received the honorary "Award for Architectural Event of the Year" from the Association of Belgrade Architects in July 2022. Serbian magazine Nedeljnik declared Konstrakta the person of the year 2022.

Discography

Singles

Awards and nominations

References

External links

Zemlja Gruva: Nisam znala da sam ovo htela - Official video 

Eurovision Song Contest entrants of 2022
Eurovision Song Contest entrants for Serbia
Living people
1978 births
Singers from Belgrade
Serbian pop singers
Serbian rock singers
University of Belgrade Faculty of Architecture alumni
21st-century Serbian women singers
Pesma za Evroviziju contestants
Pesma za Evroviziju winners